António José Azevedo Pereira, known as Tozé (born 6 September 1969) is a retired Portuguese football midfielder.

References

1969 births
Living people
Sportspeople from Matosinhos
Portuguese footballers
Leixões S.C. players
F.C. Tirsense players
Leça F.C. players
F.C. Alverca players
F.C. Maia players
Padroense F.C. players
Association football midfielders
Primeira Liga players
Portugal youth international footballers